Nininger Township is a township in Dakota County, Minnesota, United States. The population was 865 at the 2000 census.

History
Nininger Township was organized in 1858, and named after the village of Nininger. In 1857, Nininger was the site of the first recorded organized baseball club in Minnesota.  They proposed extending a challenge to the "whole west" in a game of baseball.  All that currently remains of the city of Nininger are a few buildings dedicated to township management and two historical markers.

Geography
According to the United States Census Bureau, the township has a total area of 17.2 square miles (44.6 km), of which 13.3 square miles (34.6 km)  is land and 3.9 square miles (10.0 km)  (22.49%) is water.

Demographics

As of the census of 2000, there were 865 people, 280 households, and 241 families residing in the township. There were 285 housing units at an average density of 21.4/sq mi (8.2/km). The racial makeup of the township was 98.27% White, 0.12% African American, 0.12% Native American, 0.35% Asian, 0.23% from other races, and 0.92% from two or more races. Hispanic or Latino of any race were 0.81% of the population.

There were 280 households, out of which 40.0% had children under the age of 18 living with them, 80.7% were married couples living together, 3.6% had a female householder with no husband present, and 13.6% were non-families. 8.9% of all households were made up of individuals, and 3.6% had someone living alone who was 65 years of age or older.  The average household size was 3.09 and the average family size was 3.31.

In the township the population was spread out, with 27.9% under the age of 18, 9.7% from 18 to 24, 28.8% from 25 to 44, 25.4% from 45 to 64, and 8.2% who were 65 years of age or older.  The median age was 37 years. For every 100 females, there were 103.1 males.  For every 100 females age 18 and over, there were 101.9 males.

The median income for a household in the township was $72,955, and the median income for a family was $75,477. Males had a median income of $46,146 versus $32,500 for females. The per capita income for the township was $27,337.  About 1.2% of families and 2.8% of the population were below the poverty line, including 3.7% of those under age 18 and none of those age 65 or over.

References

Townships in Dakota County, Minnesota
Utopian communities in the United States
Townships in Minnesota
Minnesota populated places on the Mississippi River